"Burnin' the Roadhouse Down" is a song recorded by American country music artists Steve Wariner and Garth Brooks.  It was released on July 13, 1998 as the third single and title track from Wariner's album Burnin' the Roadhouse Down.  The song reached number 26 on the Billboard Hot Country Singles & Tracks chart.  Wariner wrote the song with Rick Carnes.

Chart performance

References

1998 singles
1998 songs
Steve Wariner songs
Garth Brooks songs
Songs written by Steve Wariner
Capitol Records Nashville singles